Saskatchewan is a word originating from the Cree language term kisiskāciwani-sīpiy, meaning "swift-flowing river". It may refer to:

Territorial Divisions
Saskatchewan, one of Canada's provinces since 1905
History of Saskatchewan
District of Saskatchewan, part of the Northwest Territories of Canada from 1882 to 1905, partly overlapping the current province of the same name
Saskatchewan (Provisional District), a federal electoral district in the then-Northwest Territories

Natural Features
Saskatchewan River, a river in Saskatchewan and Manitoba, Canada
South Saskatchewan River, a river in Southern Alberta and Saskatchewan, Canada
North Saskatchewan River, a river in Central Alberta and Saskatchewan, Canada
Saskatchewan Glacier, a glacier in Alberta, Canada
Mount Saskatchewan (Yukon), a mountain
Mount Saskatchewan (Alberta), another mountain

Places
Saskatchewan, Manitoba, a rural municipality in Manitoba, Canada
Fort Saskatchewan, a city in Alberta, Canada

Other
Saskatchewan Party, ruling centre-right political party in the Canadian province of Saskatchewan
University of Saskatchewan, a coeducational public research university located in Saskatoon
Saskatchewan (film),  directed by Raoul Walsh, starring Alan Ladd. released in 1954
 45561 Saskatchewan, a British LMS Jubilee Class locomotive